These are the Billboard magazine R&B singles chart number one hits of 1999:

Chart history

See also
1999 in music 
List of number-one R&B albums of 1999 (U.S.)
List of Billboard Hot 100 number-one singles of 1999

References

1999
United States RandB singles
1999 in American music